Hydrocarbon pneumonitis is a kind of chemical pneumonitis which occurs with oral ingestion of hydrocarbons and associated aspiration. It occurs prominently among children, accounting for many hospital admissions each year. Common hydrocarbons involved are mineral spirits, mineral seal oil (common in furniture polish), lamp oil, kerosene (paraffin), turpentine (pine oil), gasoline, and lighter fluid. Pneumatocele is a complication of hydrocarbon pneumonitis. In both childhood and adult pneumonitis, hydrocarbon aspiration occurs at the time of initial ingestion event or subsequently with vomiting. Low viscosity of an ingested hydrocarbon is considered a major factor promoting aspiration (presumably for mechanical reasons). Contrary to aspiration hydrocarbon pneumonitis, hydrocarbon (solvent) vapor inhalation manifests primarily in either central nervous system or cardiac effects.

Fire-eater's lung 
"Fire-eater's lung" is an important variant of hydrocarbon pneumonitis, which typically involves adolescents or young adults who are exposed through mishap during flame-blowing performances using a variety of different flammable materials. The substances used overlap with some of the pediatric exposures (kerosene, gasoline) but can also include other hydrocarbons such as jet fuel and, in France, an aromatic hydrocarbon enriched petroleum-distillate called "kerdan". There has also been a case of citronella oil aspiration in a fire-eater. As with hydrocarbon pneumonitis in children, fire-eater's lung can also be complicated by pneumatocele. Although the term "acute lipoid pneumonia" has been used to refer to the "fire-eater's lung" syndrome, this is a misnomer.

Symptoms 
Oral ingestion of hydrocarbons often is associated with symptoms of mucous membrane irritation, vomiting, and central nervous system depression. Cyanosis, tachycardia, and tachypnea may appear as a result of aspiration, with subsequent development of chemical pneumonitis. Other clinical findings include albuminuria, hematuria, hepatic enzyme derangement, and cardiac arrhythmias. Doses as low as 10 ml orally have been reported to be potentially fatal, whereas some patients have survived the ingestion of 60 ml of petroleum distillates. A history of coughing or choking in association with vomiting strongly suggests aspiration and hydrocarbon pneumonia. Hydrocarbon pneumonia is an acute hemorrhagic necrotizing disease that can develop within 24 h after the ingestion. Pneumonia may require several weeks for complete resolution.

Symptoms of chemical (hydrocarbon) pneumonia may include:

 burning of the nose, eyes, lips, mouth, and throat
 dry cough
 wet cough producing clear, yellow, or green mucus
 cough producing blood or frothy pink matter
 nausea or abdominal pain
 chest pain
 shortness of breath
 painful breathing or pleuritis (an inflammation of the outside covering of the lungs)
 headache
 flu symptoms

Treatment 
General treatment principles are removal from exposure, protection of the airway (i.e., preemptive intubation), and treatment of hypoxemia. Concomitant airway injury with acute bronchospasm often warrants treatment with bronchodilators because of the airway obstruction.

A beneficial role for corticosteroids has not been established by controlled trials in humans. Despite the lack of controlled evidence of efficacy, anecdotal reports of benefits from systemic corticosteroid use continue to appear.

Prophylactic antibiotic drugs have not proved to be efficacious in toxic lung injury. Antibiotics should be reserved for those patients with clinical evidence of infection.

See also 
 Fire-eater's lung
 Fluorocarbon aerosol spray pneumonitis

References 

Pneumonia